John W. "Jack" McGowan (December 18, 1930 – February 15, 2001) was an American professional golfer.

McGowan was born in Concord, New Hampshire. He turned professional in 1954 and joined the PGA Tour in 1961.

He played on the PGA Tour through 1970, winning one event, the 1964 Mountain View Open among 32 top-10 finishes. He had four runner-up finishes: 1964 St. Paul Open Invitational to Chuck Courtney, 1964 Sahara Invitational to R. H. Sikes, 1965 Western Open to Billy Casper, and 1969 Texas Open Invitational to Deane Beman.

Professional wins (1)

PGA Tour wins (1)

PGA Tour playoff record (0–1)

References

American male golfers
PGA Tour golfers
Golfers from New Hampshire
Sportspeople from Concord, New Hampshire
1930 births
2001 deaths